India Evangelical Lutheran Church (IELC) is a Christian denomination in India. Its headquarters is in Tamil Nadu. It belongs to the International Lutheran Council and the Lutheran World Federation. It has four synods named Ambur Synod, Nagercoil Synod, Kerala Synod and Trivandrum Synod.The India Evangelical Lutheran Church was founded through the missionary efforts of the Lutheran Church–Missouri Synod (LCMS), with whom it remains in altar and pulpit fellowship.

The inception of IELC is rooted in the mission work of LCMS, beginning in 1894. Over the following decades, the LCMS sent more than 60 missionaries to serve in India. The work in India was known as the Missouri Evangelical Lutheran Mission (MELIM) and was carried out in areas of the Tamil and Malayalam languages. In 1959, the IELC was established as an LCMS partner church and now does work in an additional seven languages.

There are four Synods functioning within IELC.All Synods are Autonomous Bodies.The Kerala Synod was constituted by the bifurcation of Trivandrum Synod during 11th December 1988 and it was recognised by the civil courts and High Court of Kerala and High Court of Madras.The Kerala Synod has  290 local Churches (Congregations ) and 40 number of educational institutions (Schools) and Hospitals under it's administrative Control. The Trivandrum Synod  has 31 Local Churches and 5  Schools( 3 Schools only in Kerala) 
The Kerala Synod has implemented Bishop System of Administration. There are six Arch Dioceses Constituted within the Kerala Synod and they are (1) Thiruvananthapuram (2)Alappuzha (3) Ernakulam(4) Malappuram/Wayanad (5) Chennai /Kanyakumari and (6)Mumbai/Gujarat Arch Diocese.Under the Arch Diocese, there are a number of Diocese functioning.The Delhi Diocese comes within the administrative control of Thiruvananthapuram Arch Diocese.

The IELC has approximately 764 congregations, 115,000 baptized members, 70,000 communicant members, and 220 active pastors. It also has 59 elementary schools, 11 high schools, 7 schools for the handicapped, and three hospitals. There about 800 teachers serve those schools, many of them graduates of the IELC's teachers training institute. 

Concordia Theological Seminary in Nagercoil was founded in 1924 to train pastors. On 30 November 2017, Cyclone Ockhi damaged the seminary campus so severely that IELC leaders doubted that they would ever be able to reopen. Nevertheless, the seminary was able to rebuild. The new and renovated structures have retained the historic appearance of the campus. The rededication in June 2022 included representatives from the LCMS, which had helped with the reconstruction. The reopened seminary has almost 100 students, with plans to increase enrollment to 130 in two years.
A new Seminary "Concordia Theological Seminary "was also constituted by the Kerala Synod at Thiruvananthapuram. The Major Arch Bishop &  President of the Kerala Synod is Most Rev Adv.Dr.Robinson David Luther ( Founder Leader ).

The IELC is a member of the World Council of Churches, the Christian Conference of Asia, the National Council of Churches in India, and the Lutheran World Federation Council of Churches in India. It is a member church in the United Evangelical Lutheran Churches in India (UELCI), a communion of Lutheran churches.

The current president of the IELC is Rev. Suviseshamuthu, who was elected as president of the IELC in May 2017, succeeding President Gambeeram, who presided at the election; President Suviseshamuthu's election was also observed by two representative of the Office of International Mission of the LCMS. LCMS representatives likewise witnessed the election of Rev. Gambeeram on 27 May 2014, who succeeded President Samuel. President Harrison officially recognized Rev. Raja Gambeeram as the president of the IELC on behalf of the LCMS on Epiphany, 6 January 2015.

See also
Christ Lutheran Church Kattukadai

References

External links
Website of the India Evangelical Lutheran Church (IELC)
Website of the United Evangelical Lutheran Church in India
Website of the Trivandrum Synod of the India Evangelical Lutheran Church (IELC)

See also
Adivasi
Christianity in India

1959 establishments in India
Christianity in Karnataka
Christianity in Tamil Nadu
Lutheranism in India
International Lutheran Council members
Lutheran World Federation members
Affiliated institutions of the National Council of Churches in India